Apparao Driving School  is a 2004 Telugu-language comedy film, produced by Devireddy Srikar Reddy on Jagadish Cine Makers banner and directed by Anji Seenu. Starring Rajendra Prasad, Preeti Jhangiani, Malavika  and music composed by Ghantadi Krishna. The film recorded as a flop at box office.

Plot
Apparao (Rajendra Prasad) runs a ladies-only driving school that was founded by his great-grandfather. Anjali (Preeti Jhangiani) is the daughter of a faction leader, Reddy (Jaya Prakash Reddy). She falls in love with Apparao. At the same time, Apparao's marriage gets fixed with Maha Lakshmi (Malavika). Being a timid guy that he is, Apparao approaches Reddy and tells him that Anjali is in love with him. Reddy reveals that his daughter is suffering from blood cancer and pleads Apparao to pretend love to Anjali so that she could fulfill her wishes during the end days of her life. The rest of the story is all about how Apparao manages to deal with two girls.

Cast

Rajendra Prasad as Appa Rao
Preeti Jhangiani as Anjali
Malavika as Lakshmi (Appa Rao's wife)
Suman as Anjali's cousin (Cameo appearance)
Brahmanandam as Losugula Lakshma Reddy (Lakshmi's uncle)
Jeeva as Khan 
Raghu Babu as Appa Rao's lawyer
Karate Kalyani as Khan's lawyer (Raghu Babu's wife)
Banerjee as SI
Gundu Hanumantha Rao as Appa Rao's assistant
M. S. Narayana
Jaya Prakash Reddy as Anjali's father
Duvvasi Mohan as Khan's assistant
Sarika Ramachandra Rao
Naveen
Devi Charan
Annapurna as Apparao's grand mother
Chalapathi Rao as Lakshmi's father
Kavitha as Lakshmi's mother
Sirisha 
Apoorva

Soundtrack

Music composed by Ghantadi Krishna. Music released on Maruthi Music Company.

Others
 VCDs and DVDs on - VOLGA Videos, Hyderabad

References

2000s Telugu-language films
Driver's education